XHTD-FM is a radio station on 101.7 FM in Coatzacoalcos, Veracruz, Mexico. It is owned by Grupo Radio Digital and carries its "Soy FM" pop format.

History

XHTD received its concession on September 27, 1979. It was owned by Octavio Tena Álvarez del Castillo. It was sold to Frecuencia Modulada de Coatzacoalcos, S.A. de C.V. on May 15, 1986 and became part of Grupo FM and then Radio Networks.

In 2016, Radio Networks, owners of XHFTI-FM and XHRN-FM, sold XHTD to Grupo Radio Digital for 71 million pesos (some US$4 million). The result was that XHTD flipped from the Más Latina grupera-tropical format used by those stations to Exa FM, and the concessionaire changed to Impulsora de Radio del Sureste, S.A., which holds the concession for Grupo Radio Digital's XHONC-FM.

Most of GRD's stations dropped their MVS Radio franchised brands on May 1, 2021. XHTD temporarily went unbranded as "101.7 FM".

References

External links
Soy 101.7 Facebook

Radio stations in Veracruz
Radio stations established in 1979